The SEC Championship Game is an annual American football game that has determined the Southeastern Conference's season champion since 1992. The championship game pits the SEC East Division regular season champion against the West Division regular season champion.  Since 2007, the game has typically been played on the first Saturday of December, and the game has been held in Atlanta since 1994, first at the Georgia Dome, and at Mercedes-Benz Stadium since 2017.

Ten of the fourteen current SEC members have played in the SEC Championship Game. Kentucky and Vanderbilt have yet to reach the game from the East, while Ole Miss and Texas A&M have yet to reach the game from the West. The overall series is led by the Western Division, 18–13.

While ten SEC members have played in the game, only six have won: Florida, Georgia, and Tennessee of the East Division, and Alabama, Auburn, and LSU of the West Division. Each of these teams has won the championship multiple times.

History
The SEC was the first NCAA conference in any division to hold a football championship game that was exempt from NCAA limits on regular-season contests. Such a game was made possible by two separate developments. The first came in 1987, when the NCAA membership approved a proposal sponsored by the Division II Pennsylvania State Athletic Conference and Central Intercollegiate Athletic Association that allowed any conference with at least 12 football members to split into divisions and stage a championship game between the divisional winners. The SEC took advantage of this rule by adding the University of Arkansas and the University of South Carolina in 1992, bringing the conference membership to 12, and splitting into two football divisions. The format has since been adopted by other conferences to decide their football champion (the first being the Big 12 in 1996).

The first two SEC Championship Games were held at Legion Field in Birmingham, Alabama. From 1994 until 2016 the game was played at the Georgia Dome in Atlanta. With the Georgia Dome scheduled to be demolished after the 2016 season, the SEC chose to keep the title game in Atlanta at the Georgia Dome's replacement, Mercedes-Benz Stadium. The game will be played at the new stadium through at least 2027.

Between 2006 and 2013 the winner of the SEC Championship Game went on to play in the BCS National Championship Game eight straight years, posting a 6-2 record. Since 2014, the SEC Championship Game winner has gone on to appear in the College Football Playoff every season, posting a 6–1 record in the national semi-final and a 3–3 record in the College Football Playoff National Championship.

Results
Results from all SEC Championship games that have been played. Rankings are from the AP Poll released prior to matchup.

Results by team

 Kentucky, Ole Miss, Texas A&M, and Vanderbilt have yet to make an appearance in an SEC Championship Game.

Home/away designation
The team designated as the "home" team alternates between division champions.  The designation goes to the East champion in even-numbered years and the West champion in odd-numbered years.

After the 2020 contest, the designated "home" team is 16–13 overall in SEC championship games.

In 2009, the West champion, Alabama, was the home team, ending a streak where the SEC West team had worn white jerseys in nine consecutive SEC Championship Games (2000–2008). This was because LSU had represented the West in the previous four seasons that the West Division champion was the "home" team, and LSU traditionally chooses to wear white jerseys for home games. Additionally, for the next three years (2010–2012), the East Division representative wore their home jerseys because in 2011, LSU again represented the West; this happened again from 2018-2020 since LSU represented the West in 2019.

Rematches
While SEC schools play every other member of their own division, they do not play every member of the opposite division; thus, the SEC Championship Game is not guaranteed to be a rematch of a regular season game. The SEC Championship game has featured a rematch of a regular season game a total of seven times (1999, 2000, 2001, 2003, 2004, 2010, 2017). The team which won the regular season game is 5–2 in the rematches, the exceptions being 2001 and 2017.

Common matchups
Matchups that have occurred more than once:

Selection criteria
Division standings are based on each team's overall conference record.  The SEC Commissioner's Regulations requires each football team play all eight conference games in a season in order to be eligible to compete for a divisional title and play in the SEC Championship Game. When two or more teams tie for the best record in their division, each team is recognized as a divisional co-champion. Tiebreakers are used to determine who will represent the division in the championship game.

Two-team tie-breaker procedure
 Head-to-head competition between the two tied teams.
 Records of the tied teams within the division.
 Records against the team within the division with the best overall (divisional and non-divisional) conference record and proceeding through the division. Multiple ties within the division will be broken from first to last.
 Complete record vs. all non-divisional opponents.
 Complete record vs. all common non-divisional teams if there be any.
 Record vs. common non-divisional opponent (if there be any) with the best overall conference (divisional and non-divisional) record and proceeding through other common non-divisional teams based on their order of finish within their division.
 Best cumulative conference winning percentage of non-divisional opponents
 Coin flip of the tied teams

NOTE:  Although all division rivals meet during the season and NCAA overtime is played, the SEC has provisions in case a game ends in a tie, which is possible under NCAA Rule 3–3–3 (c.2) and (d), Suspending the Game, and Commissioner's Regulations (including a tie game after the end of three periods, at the point the game is suspended in the fourth period, or end of regulation (3-3-3-d) or if one team had played their overtime period but the opponent had not played, when the game reaches the conference curfew of 1:30 a.m. local time), or if the two tied teams did not play an official game because of weather (including a game that ends before the end of three periods), which is possible because numerous conference teams have had games affected by hurricanes but also lightning.  As such, SEC rules, written before overtime was implemented in regular season play, still contain the remaining procedures if those circumstances were to happen.

Three or more-team procedure
(Once the tie has been reduced to two teams, go to the two-team tie-breaker format.)
 Combined head-to-head record among the tied teams.
 Record of the tied teams within the division.
 Records against the team within the division with the best overall (divisional and non-divisional) Conference record and proceeding through the division. Multiple ties within the division will be broken from first to last.
 Complete record vs. non-division teams.
 Complete record vs. all common non-divisional teams.
 Record vs. common non-divisional team with the best overall Conference (divisional and non-divisional) record and proceeding through other common non-divisional teams based on their order of finish within their division.
 Best cumulative Conference winning percentage of non-divisional opponents (Note: If two teams' non-divisional opponents have the same cumulative record, then the two-team tiebreaker procedures apply. If four teams are tied, and three teams' non-divisional opponents have the same cumulative record, the three-team tiebreaker procedures will be used beginning with #1
 Coin flip of the tied teams with the team with the odd result being the representative (Example: If there are two teams with tails and one team with heads, the team with heads is the representative)

Winner's bowl performance
Currently the SEC champion plays in the Sugar Bowl unless it has been selected to play in a College Football Playoff semi-final bowl, or if the Sugar Bowl is hosting a CFP semi-final and the SEC champion either does not qualify for the CFP or has a seeding that prevents it from appearing in the Sugar Bowl. In the SEC Championship Game era, eleven winners of the game have gone on to win the national title (outright or shared), with thirteen SEC teams winning national titles overall, including seven consecutive titles from the 2006–2012 seasons.

There are three occasions when the SEC champion advanced to the BCS or CFP but lost to another SEC team which won the national championship:

In 2011, LSU won the SEC Championship Game and advanced to the BCS National Championship Game which they lost 21–0 to fellow SEC West member Alabama.

In 2017, Georgia won the SEC Championship Game and advanced to the College Football Playoff, defeating Oklahoma in the semifinal and advancing to the CFP final game, which they lost 26–23 in overtime to SEC member Alabama.

In 2021, Alabama won the SEC Championship game and advanced to the College Football Playoff, defeating Cincinnati in the semifinal and advancing to the CFP final game, which they lost 33-18 to Georgia in a rematch of the SEC title game. It marked the 1st time that the loser of the conference championship would go onto winning the national championship game in the same season.

Rankings are from the AP Poll at the time the game was played.

Runner-up's bowl performance
Rankings are from the AP Poll at the time the game was played.

Game records

See also
 List of NCAA Division I FBS conference championship games

Footnotes